Tomàs Milans i Godayol (Canet de Mar, 1672 - Girona, 1742) was a Catalan composer. He was the son of Marc Antoni Milans i Macià (Canet de Mar, 1625 - 1708) and Marianna Godayol. He was mestre de capella at Girona Cathedral.
During the War of the Spanish Succession, 1702–1713, he was director of the capilla real.

Works, editions and recordings
 Milans i Godayol: Litaniae lauretanae; Salve Regina a 6; Charitas Dei; Magnificat a 8; Suspende, infelice solo cantata for the Holy Sacrament; Reges Tharsis antiphon in canon for the Day of the Kings for 3 voices and continuo; Nunc dimittis a 6; Hala, zagalas! tono for Christmas. - Laia Frigole (soprano), La Xantria (choir), Pere Lluís Biosca, director; Musiepoca, CD, 2012
 Milans: Zarzuela al Santísimo. With works by Francisco Valls, Josep Carcoler, Antonio Literes, Joan Rossell. Mapa Harmónico dir. Francesc Bonastre. Columna Musica 2005.

References

Composers from Catalonia
1672 births
1742 deaths